Massachusetts House of Representatives' 19th Suffolk district in the United States is one of 160 legislative districts included in the lower house of the Massachusetts General Court. It covers part of Suffolk County. The seat is represented by Jeffrey Turco.

Locales represented

The district includes the following localities:
 part of Revere
 Winthrop

The current district geographic boundary overlaps with that of the Massachusetts Senate's 1st Suffolk and Middlesex district.

Representatives

 William H. Monahan, circa 1888 
 Thomas L. Noonan, circa 1888 
 Florence Driscoll, circa 1908
 Samuel Madden, circa 1908
 Thomas Fay, circa 1908
 Jacob Wasserman, circa 1918
 Thomas Leavitt, circa 1918
 Frank L. Brier, circa 1920 
 Herbert W. Burr, circa 1920 
 Elihu D. Stone, circa 1920 
 Harrison Atwood, circa 1923
 Richard McClennan Walsh, circa 1923
 William Arthur Fish, circa 1923
 John White, circa 1935
 Lawrence McHugh, circa 1935
 James Sullivan, circa 1945
 Robert Connolly, circa 1945
 Walter D. Bryan, circa 1951 
 Edmond J. Donlan, circa 1951-1953 
 William F. Sullivan, circa 1951 
 Charles Robert Doyle, circa 1953
 Joseph Michael O'Loughlin, circa 1953
 John Donovan, circa 1967
 W. Paul White, circa 1975 
 William F. Galvin, 1979-1991
 Susan Tracy, 1991–1995
 Robert DeLeo, 1995-2020
 Jeffrey Turco, 2021-present

See also
 List of Massachusetts House of Representatives elections
 Other Suffolk County districts of the Massachusetts House of Representatives: 1st, 2nd, 3rd, 4th, 5th, 6th, 7th, 8th, 9th, 10th, 11th, 12th, 13th, 14th, 15th, 16th, 17th, 18th
 List of Massachusetts General Courts
 List of former districts of the Massachusetts House of Representatives

Images
Portraits of legislators

References

External links
 Ballotpedia
  (State House district information based on U.S. Census Bureau's American Community Survey).

House
Government of Suffolk County, Massachusetts